The Electoral district of Goulburn Valley was an electoral district of the Victorian Legislative Assembly. The district was replaced by the district of Goulburn in 1945.

Members for Goulburn Valley

George Graham represented Numurkah and Nathalia 1889–1904.
John Mitchell was a farmer and builder who was an MLA from the 1914 Victorian State election until the 1920 Victorian State election.

Election results

See also
 Parliaments of the Australian states and territories
 List of members of the Victorian Legislative Assembly

References

Former electoral districts of Victoria (Australia)
1904 establishments in Australia
1945 disestablishments in Australia